Tosha Tsang (born October 17, 1970) is a Canadian rower. Tsang joined the Canadian national team in 1993. She competed at the 1995 World Championships, finishing sixth in the eights, and won a silver medal in the eights at the 1996 Summer Olympics.

After retiring from rowing competition, Tsang enrolled in the sociology doctoral program at the University of Alberta and obtained a Master of Library and Information Studies at the University of British Columbia's School of Library, Archival and Information Studies.

References

External links 
 
 

1970 births
Canadian female rowers
Living people
Olympic medalists in rowing
Olympic rowers of Canada
Olympic silver medalists for Canada
Rowers at the 1996 Summer Olympics
Sportspeople from Saskatoon
Medalists at the 1996 Summer Olympics
UBC School of Library, Archival and Information Studies alumni
20th-century Canadian women